Sally Hunter is a fictional character from the British soap opera Hollyoaks, played by Katherine Dow Blyton. The character made her first on-screen appearance on 26 July 2001.

Development
Dow Blyton made her first appearance on 26 July 2001, as Sally arrives in Chester to sort out her "warring" family. Hollyoaks marks Dow Blyton's first major acting role. Sally is characterised as a "strong-willed and caring" female. She has a tumultuous relationship with her husband Les Hunter (John Graham Davies), but they later "sorted out their differences". One of the Hunter family's main stories was coping with the disappearance of their eldest daughter, Ellie Mills (Sarah Baxendale). Ellie went missing in Ibiza but later returns home after two years. Steve Hendry from the Sunday Mail assessed that Ellie's disappearance left Sally "on the verge of a breakdown". Baxendale told Hendry that Ellie does not think about how her disappearance affected her family. She said that Ellie is a "bitch" who thinks she does not have to answer to anyone, including her parents.

In March 2004, a reporter from the Sunday Mirror revealed that producers at Hollyoaks were planning to write out numerous characters as part of a cast revamp. Dow Blyton was one of the cast members who would not have their contract with Hollyoaks renewed. They described it as the "biggest massacre in soap history". Dow Blyton's departure storyline featured Sally and her husband Les moving to Cyprus, following the death of their son Dan (Andrew McNair). Just before they plan to leave, Sally declares she cannot go because she is scared of air travel. Lee tries to hypnotise Sally and cure her phobia but his attempts fail. Les comes up with another form of transport and purchases a motorbike complete with a sidecar. Sally agrees to Les' new plan and they leave Hollyoaks and Lee behind. Sally made her final appearance on 4 November 2005.

Storylines
Sally is the mother of Dan, Ellie, Lisa (Gemma Atkinson) and Lee (Alex Carter), as well as the wife of Les. She began working at the local chemist in Hollyoaks, before becoming a secondary school science teacher at Hollyoaks Comprehensive. On her arrival, already Sally had her work cut out in trying to track down her eldest child Ellie who has been missing for nearly two years in Ibiza. Ellie's disappearance brought much grief into the Hunter household as youngest daughter Lisa self harmed herself and Lee was getting in trouble with the police. Things weren't made easier by the fact that Sally's husband, Les, always turned to alcohol when he couldn't cope with his daily troubles. Les's drinking split him and Sally up for a while after he accidentally hit her while drunk but through these difficult times, sally kept a strong head and kept her family together.

Eventually, when Ellie did arrived back home-suddenly things got even worse for the Hunter clan. Ellie's arrival brought more misery as she would often go against her mother's wishes. Ellie married Toby Mills (Henry Luxemburg), which the Hunter family approved off, but it was to be a huge mistake. After Ellie went missing again, Dan and Toby went to track her down but instead it was to be a horrendous night for the Hunter family. Toby had died and Dan was accused of his murder, while Ellie was left unconscious. Dan protested his innocence as he accused Toby of being the local serial killer and the Hunter family had to wait for Ellie to regain her consciousness, to clear Dan's name. When Ellie eventually woke up, she had lost her memory and accused Dan of killing her husband. This led to a long battle between the Hunter family and Ellie, climaxing to Ellie testifying against Dan in court. It led Dan to being sentenced for 15 years which left Sally devastated.

However, within time Ellie managed to get her memory back and retracted her statement, claiming Dan's innocence after all. A delighted Sally was hugely relieved when Dan was finally released, but she vowed to never forgive Ellie who moved away from Hollyoaks after Sally disowned her. For once things seemed to be getting better for Sally, but it wasn't to last for too long as son Dan died in a rally race. With so many bad memories in the village, Sally decided the best was to move away from Hollyoaks and begin a new fresh life away with husband Les. The pair bid farewell on Les's motorbike to start a new life in Cyprus.

Reception
A reporter for the Daily Record branded the character a "kindly matriarch".

References

External links
 Sally Hunter at Hollyoaks.com

Hollyoaks characters
Television characters introduced in 2001
Female characters in television